Carinodrillia bella is an extinct species of sea snail, a marine gastropod mollusk in the family Pseudomelatomidae, the turrids and allies.

Distribution
This extinct species occurs in Miocene strata of the Atlantic slope.

References

 T.A. Conrad, Proceed. A. N. S. 1862, 285

External links
 Conrad, Timothy Abbott. "Catalogue of the Miocene shells of the Atlantic slope." Proceedings of the Academy of Natural Sciences of Philadelphia (1862): 559–586.

bella
Gastropods described in 1862